Julio Montes Taracena (1915-1997) of Guatemala served as a member of the World Organization of the Scout Movement in Geneva, Switzerland from 1979 to 1985.

In 1977, Montes was awarded the 120th Bronze Wolf, the only distinction of the World Organization of the Scout Movement, awarded by the World Scout Committee for exceptional services to world Scouting. He was also a recipient of the Silver World Award.

Background
He was the owner of the El Rosario Grande farm in Tumbador, San Marcos, Guatemala.

He was an instrumental volunteer leader of Scouting in Guatemala.

Scouting
Montes Taracena took part in the following World Scout Conferences:

 1965 20th World Scout Conference Mexico City
 1967 21st World Scout Conference Seattle, Washington, United States
 1969 22nd World Scout Conference Espoo, Finland
 1971 23rd World Scout Conference Tokyo, Japan
 1973 24th World Scout Conference Nairobi, Kenya
 1975 25th World Scout Conference Lundtoft, Denmark
 1977 26th World Scout Conference Montreal, Canada
 1979 27th World Scout Conference Birmingham, United Kingdom
 1981 28th World Scout Conference Dakar, Senegal
 1985 30th World Scout Conference Munich, West Germany
 1988 31st World Scout Conference Melbourne, Australia

J. Montes attended the following Interamerican Scout Conferences:

 1957 4th Interamerican Scout Conference - February in Rio de Janeiro, Brasil
 1961 5th Interamerican Scout Conference - February  in Caracas, Venezuela
 1964 6th Interamerican Scout Conference - August  in Kingston, Jamaica
 1968 7th Interamerican Scout Conference - July in San Salvador, El Salvador
 1972 8th Interamerican Scout Conference - August in Lima, Peru
 1974 9th Interamerican Scout Conference - August in Miami, Florida, United States
 1976 10th Interamerican Scout Conference - August in Mexico City, Mexico
 1978 11th Interamerican Scout Conference - June in Guatemala, City, Guatemala
 1980 12th Interamerican Scout Conference - October in Santiago, Chile
 1982 13th Interamerican Scout Conference - July in Nassau, Bahamas
 1984 14th Interamerican Scout Conference - September in Curitiba, Paraná, Brazil
 1986 15th Interamerican Scout Conference - July in Port of Spain, Trinidad and Tobago
 1988 16th Interamerican Scout Conference - September in Buenos Aires, Argentina
 1990 17th Interamerican Scour Conference - September in Montevideo, Uruguay

References

External links

Recipients of the Bronze Wolf Award
Scouting and Guiding in Guatemala
1915 births
1997 deaths